The 1935 Providence Friars football team was an American football team that represented Providence College during the 1934 college football season. The team compiled a 6–2 record, shut out four of eight opponents, and outscored all opponents by a total of 98 to 44. The team played its home games at Hendricken Field in Providence, Rhode Island.

Joe McGee was the head coach for the second year. His assistant coaches were Phil Couhig, Charles Burdge, and Oliver Roberge. Quarterback Omer Landry was the team captain. After the successful 1935 season, Providence signed McGee to a three-year contract.

Schedule

References

Providence
Providence Friars football seasons
Providence Friars football